Scelotes uluguruensis, the Uluguru fossorial skink, is a species of lizard which is endemic to Tanzania.

References

uluguruensis
Reptiles of Tanzania
Reptiles described in 1928
Taxa named by Thomas Barbour
Taxa named by Arthur Loveridge